Rufus Lige Edmisten (born July 12, 1941) is an American attorney who served as North Carolina Secretary of State, Attorney General, and was the Democratic nominee for Governor in 1984. He is currently a lawyer in private practice.

Life and career
Edmisten was born on July 12, 1941 in Boone, North Carolina to Walter F. Edmisten and Nell Hollar Edmisten. He graduated from Appalachian High School in 1959.

He earned an undergraduate degree in political science with honors at the University of North Carolina at Chapel Hill, and a J.D. from the George Washington University Law Center in Washington, D.C., where he served on the Law Review. During law school, he joined the Capitol Hill staff of North Carolina Senator Sam Ervin, where he served as the Counsel to Senator Ervin's Judiciary Subcommittee on Constitutional Rights and as Chief Counsel and Staff Director of the Subcommittee on Separation of Powers. In 1973-1974, Edmisten was the Deputy Chief Counsel for the Senate Watergate Committee, which Ervin chaired. With Terry Lenzner, an assistant counsel on the Senate Watergate Committee, Edmisten served the subpoena to the White House for the Watergate tapes. It was the first time in history that a Congressional Committee served a subpoena on a sitting president. During his time working for Senator Ervin, Edmisten participated in important legislative initiatives, such as securing constitutional rights for American Indians and providing constitutional protections for military personnel. 
Following Senator Ervin's retirement in 1974, Edmisten returned to North Carolina. He was elected state attorney general in 1974 and served in that post for ten years. Edmisten was the Democratic nominee for governor in 1984, losing to Republican James G. Martin, a loss attributed to Martin's endorsements by Edmisten's Democratic primary rivals.

After his unsuccessful gubernatorial campaign, Edmisten practiced law with Reagan H. Weaver for four years. In the 1988 and 1992 elections, Edmisten won the office of Secretary of State. As Secretary of State he broadened securities oversight in an effort to protect investors, and worked with the General Assembly to craft a law to establish Limited Liability Companies in North Carolina.

In 1996 Edmisten resigned from office after an audit of the Secretary of State's office led to a State Bureau of Investigations inquiry into several alleged abuses of office. The investigation, which involved more than 100 interviews and culminated in a 3000-page report, exonerated Edmisten and his staff from all the accusations. Edmisten maintained that his resignation had nothing to do with the investigation. After his resignation in 1996 Edmisten launched a legal practice that merged with that of former NC Department of Justice colleague and Deputy US attorney, Woody Webb, in 1998.

Edmisten runs a charity in North Carolina called the Foundation for Good Business, Extra Special Super Kids. The Super Kids program provides college scholarships to underprivileged high school students who wish to pursue higher learning. Edmisten has served on the N.C. Capitol Foundation for over 25 years, including a six-year stint (2000–2006) as president of the foundation. He is a member of the boards of directors of the Julia Crump Foundation and Project Enlightenment, both of which are charitable organizations that seek to enhance educational opportunities for disadvantaged youths. Edmisten also served as a board member for the Raleigh region of Union Bank. Edmisten, Jim Valvano, and Don Shea founded the Jim Valvano Kids Klassic Golf Tournament, which has raised several million dollars to seek a cure for children suffering from cancer.

In addition to Edmisten’s political career and philanthropic work, he has also found success as an acclaimed writer, television news political pundit and esteemed radio personality. He was a panelist on NC Spin, North Carolina's longest running political talk show (the final episode of NC Spin aired on Christmas Day 2020). 

He is also a longstanding co-host of the popular radio program Weekend Gardener on WPTF in Raleigh, NC. The program holds the distinction of being the longest running gardening radio show in history. (Weekend Gardener initially began in 1924 on WPTF as an on-air gardening report from “The Good Garden Ladies of Raleigh” of the Raleigh Garden Club. The show has retained its current title since January 1985.) Edmiston is, himself, an avid gardener. 

In 2019 Edmisten wrote and published a memoir entitled, “That's Rufus: A Memoir of Tar Heel Politics, Watergate and Public Life” the profits of which all go to benefit his charity “The Super Kids”.

Edmisten and his wife, Linda, live in a designated 1921 National Register and Raleigh Historic Landmark house.

Electoral history

General election results

References

External links
Edmisten & Webb
Profile at OurCampaigns.com
Foundation for Good Business: Extra Special Super Kids

Living people
North Carolina Attorneys General
North Carolina Democrats
Secretaries of State of North Carolina
1941 births
North Carolina lawyers
People from Boone, North Carolina
University of North Carolina at Chapel Hill alumni
George Washington University Law School alumni
Watergate scandal investigators
Candidates in the 1984 United States elections